Kellas is a village in Moray, Scotland. The Kellas cat is named after the village.

Villages in Moray